Thackley railway station was a railway station in Thackley, West Yorkshire, England.

History

During the 1860s, two small railway companies were formed to promote suburban railways in Bradford, the Bradford, Eccleshill and Idle Railway and the Idle and Shipley Railway.

The line was open to goods traffic on 4 May 1874, and to passengers on 18 January 1875.

Thackley railway station was rebuilt in 1890–1894.

Passenger service on the line ceased on 2 February 1931 and the passenger station closed, though goods traffic continued on the whole line until October 1964 and between Shipley and  until 1968.

The line is now a public footpath, with only ruined buildings and partially demolished platforms at track level to show that this was a railway station. The 1894 building still exists and is now a private dwelling, situated next to the 1874 humped back Crag Hill Road bridge.

References

Disused railway stations in Bradford
Former Great Northern Railway stations
Railway stations in Great Britain opened in 1878
Railway stations in Great Britain closed in 1931